Boneh Alvan (also Romanized as Boneh Alvān and Boneh Alavan) is a village in Shamsabad Rural District, in the Central District of Dezful County, Khuzestan Province, Iran. At the 2006 census, its population was 125, in 17 families.

References 

Populated places in Dezful County